Van 't Hof and Van 't Hoff are Dutch toponymic surnames meaning "from the homestead". Other variants are Van Hoff, Van den Hof, Van der Hoff, Van't Hof and Vanthof. Notable people with these surnames include:

Van 't Hof / Van't Hof
Erik Van't Hof (born 1960), Dutch-born American tennis player 
Jasper van 't Hof (born 1947), Dutch jazz pianist and keyboard-player
Kaes Van't Hof (born 1986), American tennis player
Robert Van't Hof (born 1959), American tennis player
Van 't Hoff
Dilano van 't Hoff (born 2004), Dutch racing driver
Ernst van 't Hoff (1908–1955), Dutch jazz pianist and bandleader
Jacobus Henricus van 't Hoff (1852–1911), Dutch physical chemist and Nobel Prize laureate
among others known for the van 't Hoff equation, van 't Hoff factor and Le Bel-van't Hoff rule
Robert van 't Hoff (1887–1979), Dutch architect and furniture designer
Van der Hoff
Dirk Van der Hoff (1814–1891), Dutch-born South African Protestant minister
Frans van der Hoff (born 1939), Dutch missionary who launched the first Fairtrade label
Ron van der Hoff (born 1978), Dutch archer
Van Hoff
Arthur van Hoff (born 1963), Dutch computer scientist and businessman
Nestor Nielsen van Hoff (born 1972), Uruguayan show jumping rider
Vanthof
John Vanthof (born 1963), Canadian (Ontario) politician

See also
van't Hoff (crater), a lunar crater named for Jacobus Henricus van 't Hoff
Gerard 't Hooft
Hof (surname)
Hoff (surname)
von Hoff surname

References

Van t Hof
Dutch toponymic surnames